Amanullah Khan (1946 – 6 March 2020), known (The king of comedy), professionally as Amanullah, was a Pakistani Punjabi theatre performer, comedian and TV artist regarded as one of the best comedians in the Indian subcontinent. He is cited as one of the world's best observational comedians as he learned through his surroundings and everyday happenings. He influenced many artists as well as people. Khan has a world record of 860-day night theatre plays. 

According to famous Pakistani comedian Sohail Ahmed, Amanullah Khan was regarded as one of the top comedians in Pakistan as well in the Indian subcontinent. He also appeared in Khabarzar with Aftab Iqbal on Aap News.

Early life and career
Amanullah was born in Chak Ramdas village of Gujranwala in 1946 to a common man. His father and ancestors used to sing at weddings and small functions and his family had a musical background. Due to his mother's death and his father falling ill when he was very young Amanullah spent his childhood in poverty doing daily labour work and selling eatable items near Data Darbaar Lahore where he used to earn 5–10 Rs. at that time. He was the only son of his parents  and has one sister. Amanullah started his career with stage comedy where he got a chance to show his talent at a very young age. He was introduced to the entertainment industry by the famous Pakistani singer of that time, Tufail Niazi. Tufail Niazi was his neighbour who discovered his talent and gave Amanullah a chance to show his comedic skills to the whole world. He quickly rose to prominence and made a name for himself in the industry. He has been a part of various stage dramas and has taken on the roles of various characters. He remains one of the senior-most stage actors who always made people laugh with his witty jokes and unique sense of humor.

Over the years Amanullah earned huge respect and love in the Pakistani society. He always stole the spotlight whenever he got the chance to perform in a drama or do stand up comedy. His dedication to the field of comedy earned him a place among the most renowned comedians in the Indian subcontinent. A few of his most well known pieces of work include stage dramas such as 'Khirki ke peechay,' Disco Deewanay,' and many others. He has been termed as the most remarkable comedian whose comedy and energy on stage was unmatchable. Amanullah has made a record of doing 860 shows in his career and also been honored with the Pride of Performance award in 2018 for his unparalleled quality of work in the Pakistani entertainment industry throughout his career. He has been attached to various television shows, including Khabarnaak and Mazaaq Raat, and has performed various characters. In 2010, Amanullah joined GEO News for its then new program Khabarnaak. He portrayed a simple, blind village man named Hakeem Sahab. The rest of the characters were bent on disparaging Hakeem Sahab. Khan left this TV show in August 2013.

He also played the role of Chacha Bashir in Mazaaq Raat. Some fellow comedians have reportedly said that Amanullah was their teacher, and they learnt comedy from him and from his comedy shows. He had a great sense of humor. His comedy acts were based on regular habits and daily lives of common people. Another famous Pakistani comedian Shakeel Siddiqui also reportedly showed a lot of respect for his work. Amanullah Khan was also known to occasionally deliver impromptu dialogue. He had also toured India and many famous Indian comedians including Kapil Sharma and Chandan Prabhakar regard him as their teacher and inspiration. Amanullah Khan was also known as "The King of Comedy" in Pakistan.

In 2018, he reunited with Aftab Iqbal in Khabarzar on Aap News channel.

Selected television

Filmography

Reality Shows 
 Khabarnaak (2010–2013)
 Mazaaq Raat (2013–17)
 Khabarzar (2018–2020)
 The Great Indian Laughter Challenge (2005)

Stage-o-graphy
Amanullah Khan had appeared in many stage dramas. Some of them are listed below:
 Begum Dish Antenna
Disco Deewanay
Khirki Ke Peechay
 Muhabbat CNG
 UPS
 Shartiya Mithay
 Sohni Chan Wargi
 Bara Maza Aye Ga
 Ketchup
 Chan Makhna
Ghar Ghar Bashira
Sawa Sair
Solah Baras Ke

Death
Amanullah Khan was hospitalized in January 2018. He was treated in the intensive care unit of a local hospital in Lahore but was discharged later. He was reportedly suffering from a common cold and then developed some complications. He died on 6 March 2020 due to kidney failure in a local hospital in Lahore.

Awards and recognition
Pride of Performance Award by the President of Pakistan in 2018.

References

External links

1950 births
2020 deaths
Actors from Lahore
Actors in Urdu cinema
Pakistani male stage actors
Pakistani male television actors
Pakistani stand-up comedians
Pakistani male comedians
Punjabi people
People from Lahore
Recipients of the Pride of Performance